Linto Joseph (ലിന്‍റോ ജോസഫ് ) is an Indian politician and the elected member of Kerala Legislative Assembly representing Thiruvambady constituency of Kozhikode as the member of CPIM since May 2021. He was the former President of Koodaranji Grama Panchayat. He was the former joint secretary of SFI Kerala and secretary of SFI Kozhikode, former DC Member of DYFI Kozhikode.

Personal life 
Linto was born to Palakkal Joseph and Annamma in Muthappanpuzha and is now living in Koombara, Koodaranji,  in Kozhikode district of Kerala. He studied B.Com. from College of Applied Science, Thiruvambady (IHRD CAS Thiruvambady) and pursued M.Com. from M.G. University, Kottayam. In 2021 he married Anusha K.

Political career 
In 2021 he was elected as MLA of Thiruvambady. He was the former President of Koodaranji Grama Panchayat in the year 2020. He was the former joint secretary of SFI Kerala and secretary of SFI Kozhikode.

References 

Kerala MLAs 2021–2026
Communist Party of India (Marxist) politicians from Kerala
1992 births
Living people